Eirik Bakke (born 13 September 1977 in Sogndal) is a Norwegian retired football player. He played as a right or centre midfielder. After retiring he went on to manage Sogndal, his home town. 

His son Johan Johanessen Bakke, is also a footballer, currently playing for Molde FK.

Club career

Sogndal (1993-1999)
Bakke played 99 matches for Sogndal. His father Svein had previously also played for the team.

Leeds United (1999-2006)
Bakke was bought by Leeds United in 1999 from Sogndal for £1.75 million. After an encouraging start to his career at Leeds in 1999 and 2000, injuries and poor form meant that he was never a first-team regular, even after the club was relegated from the Premiership in 2004.

Bakke's career was set back by recurring knee injuries. Patella tendinitis kept him out of the team for the start of the 2004–05 season and he tore a cruciate ligament on his return in January 2005. In August 2005, having recovered from his injury, Bakke was loaned to Aston Villa, but the loan was ended early after Leeds told Aston Villa that they wished to let Bakke go permanently, rather than on loan, and Villa chairman Doug Ellis decided against buying him.

Speculation continued over Bakke's future when he was left out of the Leeds United squad for the match against Sheffield Wednesday on 27 August 2006, with some in the press and supporters speculating that this was due to an imminent transfer. The club released a statement on 29 August 2006 effectively confirming that Bakke would be leaving Leeds United, but Bakke said that he would like to stay, and continued training with Leeds despite not playing, not wanting to return to playing in Norway at that time. The problem arose due to his £23,000-a-week wages and £4,000 appearance fees, which were originally agreed during Peter Ridsdale's chairmanship, but which the club could no longer afford. Leeds United tried to resolve the issue by offering Bakke lower wages to stay at the club, but his agent stated he wanted the contractually agreed wage. Eventually, Bakke left the club, as part of a wider attempt by Leeds United to reduce expenditure on player wages.

SK Brann (2006-2010)
On 31 August 2006, Bakke signed a two-year deal with SK Brann, and returned to Norway. The deal was financed by Hardball. Some media outlets claimed that Bakke and Brann had a "gentlemen's agreement", that Bakke could leave Brann if a larger club wanted to sign him, which Brann denied.

Bakke debuted for Brann on 11 September 2006 against Stabæk. He started the 2007 season playing for Brann 2nd team while returning to full fitness from his injury problems. He experienced an erratic season, making his first full Tippeliga start on 26 June 2007. He scored the winning goal against the club's arch-rivals Rosenborg BK on 11 August 2007.

Bakke promised Brann that when he was close to retirement he would finish his career in Norway with the club, playing a further one or two seasons. In the run-up to the 2008 season, Bakke became captain of Brann. On 30 May 2008, Bakke extended his Brann deal to 2010, but with a clause permitting him to re-evaluate his deal if the club decided to lay artificial turf at Brann Stadion. A few weeks later, Brann announced that the club would continue with natural grass as the turf at Brann Stadion for the coming years.

Sogndal (2011-2012) 
Bakke signed a two-year deal with Sogndal in 2011. In November 2012 he retired from active football.

International career
Bakke made his debut for Norway in a January 1999 friendly against Israel, coming on as a substitute for Egil Østenstad, and earned 26 caps, without scoring any goals. His last international match was a March 2008 friendly against Montenegro, coming on as a substitute for Martin Andresen.

Career statistics 

¹ includes FA Cup, and Norwegian Football Cup.

² Include Champions League and UEFA Cup.

Managerial statistics 
Updated 18 September 2021

Honours

Norway
Brann
Norwegian Premier League: 2007

Individual
Norwegian Football Association Gold Watch – 11 June 2003

References

External links
 Bakke heading for Leeds exit – SkySports.com
 No Way Bakke For Eirik – SkySports.com
 
 Soccerbase stats
 Guardian Football

1977 births
Living people
Norwegian footballers
Norway international footballers
Norway under-21 international footballers
Sogndal Fotball players
Leeds United F.C. players
Aston Villa F.C. players
SK Brann players
UEFA Euro 2000 players
Eliteserien players
Premier League players
People from Sogndal
Expatriate footballers in England
Norwegian expatriate footballers
Norwegian expatriate sportspeople in England
Association football midfielders
Sogndal Fotball managers
Eliteserien managers
Sportspeople from Vestland